Krasnaya Znamya is a rural locality (a khutor) in Baranovskoye Rural Settlement, Nikolayevsky District, Volgograd Oblast, Russia. The population was 45 as of 2010.

Geography 
Krasnaya Znamya is located in steppe on the left bank of the Volgograd Reservoir, 72 km east of Nikolayevsk (the district's administrative centre) by road. Krasny Meliorator is the nearest rural locality.

References 

Rural localities in Nikolayevsky District, Volgograd Oblast